James Randall Snyder (born February 7, 1981) is an American actor and singer. He graduated from Christian Brothers High School in Sacramento, California and received his Bachelor of Fine Arts from the USC School of Dramatic Arts in Los Angeles, where he was a member of the SoCal VoCals, USC's premiere a cappella group.

Professional career
Since 2002, Snyder has appeared on numerous television shows. His television credits include the television film Anna's Dream, and the TV series Married to the Kellys, Gilmore Girls, The Suite Life of Zack & Cody, Related, Without a Trace, Cold Case, Eli Stone, Drop Dead Diva, CSI: Crime Scene Investigation, Blue Bloods, and The Outrageously Fabulous Weekly Parody Talk Show. He can also be seen in the shorts The Baker's Dozen, A Cut Above, 5 or Die, Webloe Jobs, True Blood: The Parody Movie, Genre This, and, most recently, Adonis.

Snyder has had various movie roles and is best known for his role as Malcolm in She's the Man. His other roles include Dave in Pretty Persuasion, Jeremy in The Gingerbread Man, Seth in Shuttle, David in An American in China, and Ben Carter in Anderson's Cross. He finished filming the movie Meth Head, released in 2013.

On the stage, Snyder's credits include the Los Angeles and Vegas productions of Rock of Ages as Drew, Happy Days, The Fantasticks, Hamlet, Ray Bradbury's Let's All Kill Constance, Sneaux, Plop, and Oklahoma! He also played Luke Skywalker in The Star Wars Trilogy in Thirty Minutes.

Snyder originated the role of Wade "Cry-Baby" Walker in Cry-Baby, which had its premiere at La Jolla Playhouse in San Diego on November 18, 2007. He then transferred with the cast and made his Broadway debut the following year. Cry-Baby began previews at the Marquis Theatre on March 15, 2008, opened on April 24, 2008, and closed on June 22, 2008. In 2010, Snyder starred as Marius in the Encores! production of Fanny. In 2011, Snyder originated the role of Marco Venier in the premiere of Dangerous Beauty at the Pasadena Playhouse, which ran from February to March.

Snyder has appeared in several benefit concerts, including "Broadway Rocks Anaheim" and "Rebuild Japan", and in various cabarets in the Los Angeles area, including Upright Cabaret's "I Want To Hold Your Hand: The Music of the Beatles", and The Coterie's "Cousins: An Evening with Beck and May" and "Red Carpet Memories: A Celebration of Academy Award-Nominated Songs". From January 2012 to March 2012, Snyder starred as Christian in Show at Barre's "For The Record: Baz Luhrmann."

Snyder's voice can be heard on the studio recording of Bare: A Pop Opera, which was released on October 30, 2007. His first solo album, L.A. Curse, was released on March 20, 2008.  He also released a single in 2018 called "Old River Road."

Snyder performed as Billy Bigelow in Carousel at the Goodspeed Opera House in East Haddam, Connecticut, which ran from July 13, 2012 to September 29, 2012.

On August 7, 2013, it was announced that Snyder would join the cast of If/Then, a new musical opening on Broadway in Spring 2014, with a pre-Broadway run at the National Theater in Washington, D.C. from November 5 – December 8, 2013.  Snyder played the role of Josh, an army doctor who meets and falls in love with Liz (Elizabeth) (played by Idina Menzel) on her first day back in Madison Square Park in New York City. The musical opened on March 30, 2014. He was next seen as Prince Henry in the world premiere of the musical Ever After, which is based on the 1998 film of the same name. In November 2016 he originated the role of "Nate" in Broadway's first a capella musical, In Transit at the Circle in the Square Theater.

Beginning March 20, 2019, Snyder assumed the role of Harry Potter in the Broadway production of Harry Potter and the Cursed Child. He was suspended from the play in November 2021, pending an investigation, after a complaint about his conduct was filed by Diane Davis, who portrayed Ginny Potter. The investigation concluded in January 2022 and Snyder was subsequently fired from the production.

Credits

Theatre

Film

TV
Anna's Dream, Kyle (TV movie), 2002
Married to the Kellys, Zac (1 episode), 2004
Gilmore Girls, Yale Guy No. 1 (1 episode), 2004
The Suite Life of Zack & Cody, Jason Harrington (1 episode), 2005
Related, Collin, (1 episode), 2005
Without a Trace, Breck Mulligan (1 episode), 2006
Cold Case, Bingo Zohar '53 (1 episode), 2007
Eli Stone, Carter Jameson (1 episode), 2008
5 or Die, Freddy (short), 2008
Drop Dead Diva, David (1 episode), 2010
CSI: Crime Scene Investigation, Hunter Ahearn (1 episode), 2011
Blue Bloods, Billy Coffin (1 episode), 2011
The Outrageously Fabulous Weekly Parody Show, Ensemble (1 episode), 2012
Internet Icon, Actor (1 episode), 2013
Rizzoli and Isles, Brad Adams (1 episode), 2013
Hey Kid: Backstage at If/Then with James Snyder, Self (24 episodes), 2014–15
The Good Wife, Gil Berridge (1 episode), 2015

Discography
Bare: A Pop Opera (studio cast recording), 2007
L.A. Curse, 2008, debut solo album
If/Then (original Broadway cast recording), 2014, No. 19 on the Billboard 200
Cry-Baby (studio cast recording), 2015

Concerts
February 28, 2011 – Show at Barre in Los Angeles (w/ Bryce Ryness)
May 3, 2015 – Birdland (w/ Prince Charming)
September 17, 2015 – Cry-Baby Reunion at 54 Below

Awards and nominations
2014 Broadway.com Audience Award for Favorite Onstage Pair (w/ Idina Menzel) for If/Then (won)
2014 Broadway.com Audience Award for Favorite Supporting Actor in a Musical for If/Then (nominated)

References

External links
 
 
 

1981 births
21st-century American male actors
American male film actors
American male musical theatre actors
American male stage actors
American male television actors
Living people
People from Greater Los Angeles
People from Sacramento, California
People from Santa Clara, California
USC School of Dramatic Arts alumni